St. Bridget's Roman Catholic Church Complex is a historic Roman Catholic church complex located in Bloomfield, Ontario County, New York. The complex consists of three contributing buildings (church, built 1874–1875; rectory, built 1897; and carriage barn, built 1904) and one contributing site, the church cemetery.  the church is a late Victorian eclectic brick edifice with restrained Italianate and Romanesque Revival–style design and decorative features.  It features a square, wood bell tower.  The rectory is a -story Colonial Revival–style frame building and features a verandah with Doric order columns.  A -story carriage barn stands behind the rectory.  The six-acre cemetery includes burials dating from 1866 to 1942.

It was listed on the National Register of Historic Places in 1992.

References

External links

St. Bridget/St. Joseph - E. Bloomfield, New York - Roman Catholic Churches on Waymarking.com
St. Bridget / St. Joseph Catholic Community website

Churches on the National Register of Historic Places in New York (state)
Colonial Revival architecture in New York (state)
Italianate architecture in New York (state)
Roman Catholic churches completed in 1875
19th-century Roman Catholic church buildings in the United States
Churches in Ontario County, New York
National Register of Historic Places in Ontario County, New York
Italianate church buildings in the United States